The Kiribati national futsal team represents Kiribati in futsal. They participated in the 2011 Oceanian Futsal Championship. Their biggest loss was 21–1 to the New Zealand national futsal team. Their biggest victory was 3–2 over Tuvalu.

See also
 Kiribati national football team
 Kiribati women's national football team
 Kiribati Islands Football Association

Oceanian national futsal teams
F